Sudket Prapakamol (born 8 February 1980) is a badminton player from Thailand. He is a police lieutenant and a sportsman like his brother. He has a Bachelor's degree from the University of the Thai Chamber of Commerce.

Career 
He competed in badminton at the 2004 Summer Olympics in men's doubles with partner Patapol Ngernsrisuk. They were defeated in the round of 32 by Anthony Clark and Nathan Robertson of Great Britain. Prapakamol also competed in the mixed doubles with partner Saralee Thungthongkam. They had a bye in the first round and were defeated by Fredrik Bergström and Johanna Persson of Sweden in the round of 16.

He played for Thailand in Thomas Cup 2008 as with Songpol Anukritayawan. Thailand was crushed in the quarter finals. Prapakamol made his second appearance at the Olympic Games in 2008. He and Thungthongkam were defeated by the first seeded from Indonesia Nova Widianto and Liliyana Natsir in the quarter finals.

In 2012, Prapakamol and Thungthongkam again competed in the Olympic Games, played in the mixed doubles, reaching the quarter finals where they were beaten by Christinna Pedersen and Joachim Fischer Nielsen of Denmark.

He ended his international career after competed at the Thailand Masters in February 2016.

Achievements

World Championships 
Mixed doubles

World Cup 
Mixed doubles

Asian Games 
Mixed doubles

Asian Championships 
Mixed doubles

Southeast Asian Games 
Men's doubles

Mixed doubles

Summer Universiade 
Men's doubles

Mixed doubles

World Junior Championships 
Boys' doubles

Asian Junior Championships 
Boys' doubles

BWF Superseries 
The BWF Superseries, which was launched on 14 December 2006 and implemented in 2007, is a series of elite badminton tournaments, sanctioned by the Badminton World Federation (BWF). BWF Superseries levels are Superseries and Superseries Premier. A season of Superseries consists of twelve tournaments around the world that have been introduced since 2011. Successful players are invited to the Superseries Finals, which are held at the end of each year.

Mixed doubles

  BWF Superseries Finals tournament
  BWF Superseries Premier tournament
  BWF Superseries tournament

BWF Grand Prix 
The BWF Grand Prix had two levels, the BWF Grand Prix and Grand Prix Gold. It was a series of badminton tournaments sanctioned by the Badminton World Federation (BWF) which was held from 2007 to 2017. The World Badminton Grand Prix sanctioned by International Badminton Federation (IBF) from 1983 to 2006.

Men's doubles

Mixed doubles

 BWF Grand Prix Gold tournament
 BWF & IBF Grand Prix tournament

IBF International 
Men's doubles

Mixed doubles

References

External links 
 
 
 

1980 births
Living people
Sudket Prapakamol
Sudket Prapakamol
Badminton players at the 2004 Summer Olympics
Badminton players at the 2008 Summer Olympics
Badminton players at the 2012 Summer Olympics
Sudket Prapakamol
Badminton players at the 2002 Asian Games
Badminton players at the 2006 Asian Games
Badminton players at the 2010 Asian Games
Badminton players at the 2014 Asian Games
Sudket Prapakamol
Asian Games medalists in badminton
Medalists at the 2006 Asian Games
Medalists at the 2010 Asian Games
Competitors at the 1999 Southeast Asian Games
Competitors at the 2001 Southeast Asian Games
Competitors at the 2003 Southeast Asian Games
Competitors at the 2005 Southeast Asian Games
Competitors at the 2007 Southeast Asian Games
Competitors at the 2009 Southeast Asian Games
Competitors at the 2011 Southeast Asian Games
Competitors at the 2015 Southeast Asian Games
Sudket Prapakamol
Sudket Prapakamol
Sudket Prapakamol
Southeast Asian Games medalists in badminton
Universiade gold medalists for Thailand
Universiade bronze medalists for Thailand
Universiade medalists in badminton
Medalists at the 2007 Summer Universiade